Anne Marie Stavnes (26 August 1918 in Aure – 28 August 2002) was a Norwegian Centre Party politician.

She served as a deputy representative to the Norwegian Parliament from Møre og Romsdal between  1969–1973 and 1973–1977.
On a local level she was a member of the executive committee of Aure municipality council between 1963 & 1983.

References

1918 births
2002 deaths
Deputy members of the Storting
Centre Party (Norway) politicians
Møre og Romsdal politicians
Women members of the Storting
20th-century Norwegian women politicians
20th-century Norwegian politicians
People from Aure, Norway